Elissa Silverman is an American politician and reporter from Washington, D.C., the United States capital. She served as an independent at-large member of the Council of the District of Columbia from 2015 to 2023. Before 2015, she was a journalist at The Washington Post and Washington City Paper covering D.C. politics, and a policy analyst at the D.C. Fiscal Policy Institute. She was re-elected in November 2018 for a four-year term, but lost her re-election bid in 2022.

Early life and professional career
Elissa Silverman was born to parents Jack and Ruth Silverman in Baltimore, Maryland, where she attended public school. She majored in economics and history at Brown University. She has worked as a reporter for The Washington Post and, earlier, the Washington City Paper where she wrote the Loose Lips column. She also helped the D.C. Public Trust in its attempt to prohibit direct corporate contributions in local politics. In April 2009, she was hired as a policy analyst and communications director at the D.C. Fiscal Policy Institute, a position she held until resigning to run for public office in April 2014. She attended the University of Maryland, pursuing a master's degree in urban studies and planning.

Political career

2013 election
When At-large Council Member Phil Mendelson was elected council chairman in 2012, his former seat on the Council was declared vacant. Silverman filed to run as a Democratic candidate for the at-large seat. Silverman ran against incumbent Anita Bonds, and Board of Education member Patrick Mara. Silverman said she would not accept campaign contributions from corporations.

Silverman supported increasing funding to government programs that subsidize affordable housing, and expanding the minimum wage law to cover restaurant workers. Silverman said it is a problem that a quarter of District students attend their zoned neighborhood schools, saying more governmental resources should improve schools.

Following a $440 million budget surplus in 2012, Bonds and Mara supported tax cuts, while Silverman said she would prioritize helping people in other ways before cutting taxes. A political action committee criticized Silverman when she said she did not think residents minded paying taxes and minded poor city services more.

Silverman and her campaign tried to negotiate a deal with rival candidate Matthew Frumin, asking him to drop out of the election in exchange for her supporting him in a future election. Frumin declined the offer, saying he felt he still had a chance to win. Frumin said Silverman's offer may contradict her case for being a reformer.

"It was explicit that she would support me in a Ward 3 race, including against Mary Cheh," said Frumin, who has consistently said he has no interest in running against Cheh next year. "The idea of an attempted deal, maybe that is what happens in politics, but when you are claiming a whole new politics, that is something of an issue."

Silverman's candidacy was endorsed by Council Member David Grosso former Council Member Sharon Ambrose, and former Council Member Kathy Patterson. She was also endorsed by the editorial board of the Washington City Paper, Democracy for America, and the Office and Professional Employees International Union Local 2.

Silverman finished second to Anita Bonds, by a margin of 31% to 28%.

2014 election
 
When independent Council Member David Catania decided to run for mayor rather than reelection in 2014, Silverman decided to change her official political status to independent and leave her position at the D.C. Fiscal Policy Institute to consider another candidacy. Silverman publicly declared her candidacy for Council the next month.

Silverman emphasized accountability of elected officials, accountability of public schools, quality education, affordable housing, and good public transportation. Silverman said she would not accept campaign contributions from corporations. She was proud of helping increase the District's minimum wage to $11.50 per hour and expand the mandatory paid sick leave law to restaurant employees.

Silverman's candidacy was endorsed by Ward 8 Council Member Marion Barry, Ward 6 Council candidate Charles Allen, the D.C. Chapter of the National Organization for Women, D.C. Working Families, Jews United for Justice, and the D.C. Muslim Caucus, Metro Washington Council AFL–CIO, Service Employees International Union 32BJ and 1199, DC for Democracy, the Sierra Club, the DC Police Union, the United Food and Commercial Workers local, and the International Association of Fire Fighters Local 36. She was also endorsed by the editorial board of the Washington City Paper.

Silverman was elected to the at-large seat in the 2014 general election with 12% of the total votes.

2018 election 
Silverman stood for re-election in the 2018 general election. Among her challengers were S. Kathryn Allen, a business-backed challenger who was a former insurance agent and banking commissioner. Allen, who was endorsed by former mayor Anthony Williams and former D.C. Councilmember David Catania, had specifically challenged Silverman over the latter's support of a comprehensive paid leave proposal which was passed into law by the council in 2016. Allen and other opponents of the paid leave bill argued that it imposes a costly tax on DC businesses and that the benefits will primarily accrue to residents of Maryland and Virginia who commute into the city. Allen was disqualified from the 2018 ballot as a result of signature fraud on her nominating petitions. Dionne Reeder, a candidate backed by Mayor Muriel Bowser, entered the race to replace Silverman, though was not successful in the November 2018 general election.

2022 election 
Silverman lost her re-election bid in November 2022 to Anita Bonds and Kenyan McDuffie, where two seats were up for election.

Positions
In 2016, Silverman introduced legislation to limit public spending on a proposed practice facility for the Washington Wizards. The law would cap public expenditures at $50 million and hold Ted Leonsis' company, which owns the team, responsible for any cost overruns.

Committees
Silverman was appointed to the following committees for Council Period 21 (January 2015 to December 2016). 
 Committee on Business, Consumer and Regulatory Affairs
 Committee on Housing and Community Development
 Committee on Finance and Revenue

Personal life
Silverman lives in Capitol Hill. She is Jewish.

Electoral results

References

External links
 
 

21st-century American politicians
21st-century American women politicians
American women journalists
Brown University alumni
Jewish American people in District of Columbia politics
Living people
Members of the Council of the District of Columbia
The Washington Post journalists
University of Maryland, College Park alumni
Washington, D.C., government officials
Washington, D.C., Independents
Women city councillors in the District of Columbia
Year of birth missing (living people)
Jewish women politicians
21st-century American Jews
21st-century American journalists